The year 1928 in architecture involved some significant architectural events and new buildings.

Events
 February – Hannes Meyer succeeds Walter Gropius as head of the Bauhaus school.
 June – Congrès Internationaux d'Architecture Moderne is initiated by Le Corbusier.
 Le Corbusier wins all three competitions for design of the Tsentrosoyuz building in Moscow.
 Léon Azéma is appointed Architect of the City of Paris.

Buildings and structures

Buildings opened

 January 1 – Milam Building in San Antonio, Texas, designed by George Rodney Willis, the tallest brick and reinforced concrete structure and first office building with built-in air conditioning in the United States at this date.
 March 31 – Stockholm Public Library in Sweden, designed by Gunnar Asplund.
 October 6 – Collège Saint Marc, Alexandria, Egypt, designed by Léon Azéma.
 October 25 – Großmarkthalle at Frankfurt am Main, designed by Martin Elsaesser.

Buildings completed

 The Royal Horticultural Society New Building, a second exhibition hall for The Royal Horticultural Society, designed by Easton & Robertson, is completed in Westminster, London, the first in the United Kingdom to have a parabolic curved concrete roof structure.
 Second Goetheanum, Dornach, Switzerland, designed by Rudolf Steiner.
 Rusakov Workers' Club in Moscow, USSR, designed by Konstantin Melnikov.
 Firestone Tyre Factory on the 'Golden Mile' of London's Great West Road, designed by Wallis, Gilbert and Partners in Art Deco style (demolished 1980).
 Granada Theatre and Temple Israel (Minneapolis), designed by Liebenberg and Kaplan.
 First Dymaxion House is designed by Buckminster Fuller.
 Balluta Buildings, St. Julian's, Malta, designed by Giuseppe Psaila.
 Industrial Trust Company Building (aka "Superman Building") in Providence, Rhode Island, designed by Walker & Gillette.
 Petersdorff Department Store in Wrocław, designed by Erich Mendelsohn.
 Samuel-Novarro House in Los Feliz, Los Angeles, California, designed by Lloyd Wright

Awards
 Olympic gold medal – Jan Wils of the Netherlands for Olympic Stadium in Amsterdam.
 Olympic silver medal – Einar Mindedal Rasmussen of Denmark for Swimming pool at Ollerup.
 Olympic bronze medal – Jacques Lambert of France for Stadium at Versailles.
 RIBA Royal Gold Medal – Guy Dawber.
 Grand Prix de Rome, architecture: Eugène Beaudouin.
 Concrete house competition winner for the Daily Mail Ideal Home Exhibition, won by Frederick MacManus of Sir John Burnet and Partners

Births

 June 24 – Ivan Štraus, Bosnian architect (died 2018)
 June 28 – Alison Smithson, née Gill, English architect (died 1993)
 August 7 – Owen Luder, British architect (died 2021)
 September 8 – Fumihiko Maki, Japanese architect
 October 25 – Paulo Mendes da Rocha, Brazilian architect Pritzker Prize laureate 2006
 December 15 – Friedensreich Hundertwasser, Austrian architect and artist (died 2000)
 date unknown – James Birrell, Australian architect

Deaths
 January 23 – A. E. Doyle, American architect (born 1877
 June 23 – Konstantīns Pēkšēns, Latvian-born architect (born 1859)
 December 10 – Charles Rennie Mackintosh, Scottish-born architect and designer (born 1868)

References